Neuhütten is a municipality in the Trier-Saarburg district, in Rhineland-Palatinate, Germany.

Neuhütten is a very active village with many cultural activities. Although the village counts only around 808 inhabitants, you can find about 13 clubs and associations.

The following clubs are active in Neuhütten (Hochwald):

Places of Interest:
Since 2015 is Neuhütten officially placed in the "Hochwald Nationalpark", therefore the surroundings and the forest is a very beautiful and peaceful place to be.
Beyond the ski cottage, which is opened whenever there is snow, is a nice location to visit as well as the old Forsthaus "Altes Forsthaus" with its horse ranch.
Recently there has been a news team at the Dollberg Neuhütten. You can watch the video at: http://www.ardmediathek.de/

Celebrities:
Klaus Mörsdorf 1909–1989), catholic theologian and canonist

 
Next exits to the highway:
Otzenhausen approximately 6 km
Hermeskeil approximately 10 km

Distance to bigger cities > 100,000 inhabitants:

Trier: approximately 44 km
Saarbrücken: approximately 56 km
Luxembourg: approximately 85 km

References

Municipalities in Rhineland-Palatinate
Trier-Saarburg